En cas de tempête, ce jardin sera fermé ("In case of storm, this garden will be closed") is the fourth studio album by Canadian singer-songwriter Béatrice Martin under her stage name Cœur de pirate, released June 1, 2018 on Dare to Care Records. Described as her most personal album, the album's themes describe and confront the process of healing from anxiety and trauma.

The album was preceded by the preview single "Prémonition" in January 2018. The single "Dans la nuit", a duet with rapper Loud, was released in May as the album's first official single.

At the Juno Awards of 2019, the album was shortlisted for the Juno Award for Francophone Album of the Year.

Chart position
The album peaked at #4 on the Canadian Albums Chart.

Track listing

References

2018 albums
Cœur de pirate albums
Bravo Musique albums